Bradfordsville is a home rule-class city in Marion County, Kentucky, in the United States. The population was 304 at the time of the 2000 census.

History
The community at the site was first known as Centerville from its supposed location at the center of the state. (Having since gained the Jackson Purchase, the present geographic center of the state remains nearby at Cowherd Road and McCarty Lane on Ky. 429 northwest of Lebanon.) The settlement was renamed Bradford's Mill after Peter Bradford's combined saw- and gristmill at the site; this became "Bradfordsville" after the establishment of a post office in 1834.

Geography
Bradfordsville is located at  (37.495328, -85.148452). Bradfordsville lies in the Rolling Fork Valley, just east of the point where the North Rolling Fork and the Big South Fork converge to form the Rolling Fork proper. The city is mostly surrounded by rugged hills, with the Muldraugh Hill escarpment rising to the south.

Bradfordsville is concentrated around the intersection of Kentucky Route 337 (Main Street) and Kentucky Route 49 (Liberty Road).  The former connects the city with Gravel Switch and the Perryville area to the northeast, while the latter connects the city with Liberty to the southeast and Lebanon to the northwest.

Climate

Demographics

As of the census of 2000, there were 304 people, 133 households, and 75 families residing in the city. The racial makeup of the city was 97.04% White, 1.32% from other races, and 1.64% from two or more races. Hispanic or Latino of any race were 1.32% of the population.

There were 133 households, out of which 29.3% had children under the age of 18 living with them, 39.1% were married couples living together, 12.0% had a female householder with no husband present, and 42.9% were non-families. 37.6% of all households were made up of individuals, and 14.3% had someone living alone who was 65 years of age or older. The average household size was 2.29 and the average family size was 2.97.

In the city, the population was spread out, with 25.7% under the age of 18, 10.9% from 18 to 24, 30.3% from 25 to 44, 18.8% from 45 to 64, and 14.5% who were 65 years of age or older. The median age was 35 years. For every 100 females, there were 83.1 males. For every 100 females age 18 and over, there were 88.3 males.

The median income for a household in the city was $16,125, and the median income for a family was $21,250. Males had a median income of $22,917 versus $17,500 for females. The per capita income for the city was $17,222. About 22.1% of families and 26.5% of the population were below the poverty line, including 27.3% of those under the age of eighteen and 17.9% of those 65 or over.

Notable people
 U. M. Rose, Arkansas lawyer

References

External links

Cities in Kentucky
Cities in Marion County, Kentucky